Clara Birnberg (1892 or 1894–1989) was a British artist, illustrator, portraitist and sculptor. After her marriage to the artist Stephen Weinstein, they changed their surname to Winsten (with her becoming Clare Winsten) and both became Quaker humanists.

Biography
Birnberg, whose father was born in Ternopil in modern Ukraine, moved to England with her family in 1902. Studying at the Slade School of Fine Art between 1910 and 1912 with Isaac Rosenberg and David Bomberg, Birnberg became the only female member of their 'Whitechapel Boys' circle of artists and poets, and was the only female exhibitor at the 1914 post-Impressionist exhibition "Twentieth Century Art: A Review of Modern Movements" at the Whitechapel Art Gallery in which this circle played a major part.

Among her sculptures are one in the Toynbee Hall in Whitechapel, and one of Joan of Arc in the garden of George Bernard Shaw’s house in Ayot St Lawrence in Hertfordshire, where Shaw and the Winstens were neighbours (Stephen already had connections with Shaw). Clare illustrated Shaw's Buoyant Billions: A Comedy of No Manners in Prose (1949), and the posthumously published My Dear Dorothea: A practical system of Moral education for females Embodied in a letter to a young person Of that sex (1956), written when he was 21.  In addition to painting Shaw a number of times, Birnberg also produced a 1946 bronze sculpture of him, which passed on his death to the Shaw Theatre and then (on its closure) to the Mayor of Camden.  She also made drawings of Shaw, as well as of Dmitri Shostakovich, Benjamin Britten and Mahatma Gandhi.

Their daughter Ruth Harrison was known as a campaigner for animal welfare.  Ruth married Dexter Harrison, a London architect.

References

1890s births
1989 deaths
20th-century British sculptors
20th-century English painters
20th-century English women artists
Alumni of the Slade School of Fine Art
British people of Ukrainian-Jewish descent
British women illustrators
Converts to Quakerism
English Jews
English Quakers
English women painters
English women sculptors
People from Ayot St Lawrence
Whitechapel Boys
Austro-Hungarian emigrants to the United Kingdom